A list of films produced in Pakistan in 1974 (see 1974 in film):

1974

See also
1974 in Pakistan

External links
 Search Pakistani film - IMDB.com

1974
Pakistani
Films